This is a list of the Secretaries-General of the Arab League since its founding in 1945.

List of Secretaries-General

See also
Arab League

Arab League, Secretaries-General
Arab League